Gordon Bennetts (26 March 1909 – 4 April 1987) was an Australian cricketer. He played one first-class cricket match for Victoria in 1929.

See also
 List of Victoria first-class cricketers

References

External links
 

1909 births
1987 deaths
Australian cricketers
Victoria cricketers